Wizz Air Bulgaria Airlines EAD was the Bulgarian division of the Hungarian Wizz Air.

History
The Bulgarian company was awarded licenses to begin services to Greece, Turkey and Moldova in 2006.

In 2011 Wizz Air Bulgaria merged with its parent for operational reasons.  All flights are now operated by Wizz Air Hungary. Wizz Air Bulgaria operated flights from Sofia to Barcelona, Valencia, Milan, Brussels and increased the number of flights to London/Luton, Rome/Fiumicino/Ciampino and Dortmund by commissioning a third Airbus A320 to serve the new routes.

Destinations

Wizz Air Bulgaria flew to the following destinations:

 Charleroi - Brussels South Charleroi Airport

 Bourgas - Bourgas Airport
 Sofia - Sofia Airport (Base)
 Varna - Varna Airport

 Beauvais - Beauvais–Tillé Airport

 Dortmund - Dortmund Airport
 Hahn - Frankfurt-Hahn Airport

 Bergamo - Orio al Serio International Airport
 Forlì - Forlì Airport
 Rome - Leonardo da Vinci–Fiumicino Airport
 Venice - Treviso Airport

 Eindhoven - Eindhoven Airport

 Barcelona - Josep Tarradellas Barcelona–El Prat Airport
 Madrid - Adolfo Suárez Madrid–Barajas Airport
 Valencia - Valencia Airport

 London - Luton Airport

Fleet
As of May 2010 Wizz Air Bulgaria operated three Airbus A320-200 aircraft. These were removed from the Bulgarian aircraft register in July 2011.

References

External links

Defunct airlines of Bulgaria
Airlines established in 2006
Airlines disestablished in 2011
Bulgarian companies established in 2006